Lake Winnipesaukee is the largest lake in the U.S. state of New Hampshire, located in the Lakes Region at the foothills of the White Mountains. The center area of the lake is called The Broads.

Winnipesaukee is the third-largest lake in New England after Lake Champlain and Moosehead Lake.

Outflow is regulated by the Lakeport Dam in Lakeport, New Hampshire, on the Winnipesaukee River.

History 

The Abenaki name Winnipesaukee (often spelled Winnipiseogee in earlier centuries) means either "smile of the Great Spirit" or "beautiful water in a high place". At the outlet of the lake, the Winnipesaukee people, a subtribe of the Pennacook, lived and fished at a village called Acquadocton. Today, the site is called The Weirs, named for the weirs that were noted by the colonists when first exploring the region.

Lake Winnipesaukee has been a popular tourist destination for more than a century, particularly among residents of Boston and New York City. 

Winnipesaukee is a glacial lake but an unusual one, since the last glaciation actually reversed the flow of its waters. Draining the central portion of New Hampshire, it once flowed southeast, leaving via what is now Alton Bay toward the Atlantic Ocean. When glacial debris blocked this path, flow was redirected westward through Paugus Bay into the Winnipesaukee River. The latter flows west from the lake and joins the Pemigewasset River in Franklin to form the Merrimack River, which flows south to Massachusetts and into the Atlantic.

Center Harbor witnessed the first intercollegiate sporting event in the United States, as Harvard defeated Yale by two lengths in the first Harvard–Yale Regatta on August 3, 1852. The outcome was repeated 100 years later when the schools celebrated the centennial of the race by again competing on Lake Winnipesaukee (Harvard winning by 2.7 seconds).

Cities and towns 
The communities that surround the lake, clockwise from the southernmost town, are:
Alton, the largest town by area in the Lakes Region.
Gilford, home to Gunstock Mountain Resort and Bank of New Hampshire Pavilion at Meadowbrook, a popular New Hampshire concert venue.
Laconia, the main commercial city on the lake. Included in Laconia is Weirs Beach, the largest public beach on Winnipesaukee. Every year Laconia is home to Bike Week, attracting tens of thousands of motorcyclists to the area.
Meredith, a tourist haven on the northwestern reach of the lake.
Center Harbor, a small town in Belknap County which serves as the winter home for the MS Mount Washington.
Moultonborough, with its Castle in the Clouds, an estate atop a small mountain.
Tuftonboro, which contains the communities of Melvin Village and Mirror Lake.
Wolfeboro, which bills itself as the "Oldest Summer Resort in America".

Divisions 
The lake consists of a wide, relatively open central region known as the Broads, surrounded by several large bays, as well as many smaller inlets.

The main sections of the lake are:

The Broads 
The Broads are a wide portion of Lake Winnipesaukee largely in Belknap County and extending slightly into Carroll County. It is a large island-free zone occupying the center of the lake.

Running along the main axis of the lake, the northwestern tip of the Broads is at the town of Center Harbor, while the southeastern end lies between the towns of Alton and Wolfeboro.

Meredith Bay 
Meredith Bay lies at the western edge of Winnipesaukee. At the northern tip of Meredith Bay is the main village of the town of Meredith. Paugus Bay branches off to the south of Meredith Bay at Weirs Beach, near to where Meredith Bay joins the main body of the lake. Meredith Bay is separated from the Broads by a relatively narrow strait bordered by Governors Island to the south and Stonedam Island to the north. The northeastern shore of Meredith Bay is a long peninsula known as Meredith Neck.

Paugus Bay 

Formerly a hydrologically distinct lake, Paugus Bay became joined to Winnipesaukee when the dam at Lakeport was constructed, raising the surface of Paugus Bay to be contiguous with Winnipesaukee. Paugus Bay joins the main lake in Meredith Bay, running south from a narrow channel connecting it to Meredith Bay. At the northern end of Paugus Bay, where it joins the main lake, is Weirs Beach, the largest and most visited public beach on the lake. At the other end is the village of Lakeport. Both Weirs Beach and Lakeport are villages within the city of Laconia. The eastern shore of the bay is closely followed by U.S. Route 3, and has numerous motels, hotels, inns, and bungalow complexes. The western shore is much less developed.

Alton Bay 
Alton Bay is a narrow bay which runs due south from the southern corner of the main lake. It lies entirely within the town of Alton. The village of Alton Bay lies at the extreme southern tip.

Wolfeboro Bay 
Wolfeboro Bay is a relatively small wide bay lying in the town of Wolfeboro, creating a small northerly bulge in the shoreline to the eastern edge of Winnipesaukee. A series of smaller lakes and streams connects Wolfeboro Bay to Lake Wentworth.

Winter Harbor 
Winter Harbor is a Y-shaped bay with two branches, separated from the Broads by Wolfeboro Neck and Tuftonboro Neck. Winter Harbor is surrounded by many quiet resort communities in the towns of Wolfeboro and Tuftonboro. It also has panoramic views of the Belknap Mountains and looks out toward Rattlesnake Island.

Moultonborough Bay 
The longest bay on Winnipesaukee is Moultonborough Bay. It is connected to the Broads by some narrow straits running between a cluster of islands including Long Island (the largest island in the lake), Cow Island, Little Bear Island, Sandy Island, and dozens of smaller islands and islets. The  Moultonborough Neck separates the length of the bay from the main axis of the lake, and the Suissevale development in the town of Moultonborough is at the northern tip of the bay. Melvin Village, the main lakeside village of the town of Tuftonboro lies along the northeastern shore of the bay, closer to where it joins the Broads.

Islands 

Long Island—
Bear Island—
Cow Island—
Governors Island—
Rattlesnake Island—
Welch Island—
Little Bear Island—
Stonedam Island—
Timber Island—
Sleepers Island—
Mark Island—
Black Island—
Barndoor Island—
Black Cat Island—
Pine Island—
Whortleberry Island—
Sandy Island—
Jolly Island—
Three Mile Island—
Round Island—
Lockes Island—
Diamond Island—
Dow Island—
Big Beaver Island—
Camp Island—
Mink Island—
Birch Island—

Six islands are connected to the mainland by bridges (Black Cat, Governors, Long, Oak, Christmas (or Plummers) in Paugus Bay, and Worcester), and another eight (Bear, Birch, Cow, East Bear, Jolly, Loon, Three Mile, and Sandy) are served by the U.S. mail boat M/V Sophie C.

Lakes Region 
Along with the rest of New Hampshire's Lakes Region, which also encompasses Lake Winnisquam, Lake Wentworth, Squam Lake, Newfound Lake, and numerous other smaller lakes and ponds, Winnipesaukee has been a vacation community for at least a century, particularly drawing people from the Boston region. The area is home to numerous summer theater troupes and offers a variety of land and water recreational activities. There are numerous hiking trails in and around the surrounding mountains, which include the Ossipee Mountains to the east, the Belknap Range to the west, and Red Hill to the north.

Ships

Steamship Mount Washington and her successor

The paddlesteamer , named after the highest of New Hampshire's White Mountains, was launched in spring 1872 to carry mail, goods, and passengers on Lake Winnipesaukee, under the flag of the Boston and Maine Railroad. The power was transferred from the vertical single cylinder to the wheel shaft by the walking beam, high above the upper deck, oscillating in the frequency of the paddle wheels. Known as "The Mount", her kitchen and restaurant service became famous.

On December 23, 1939, a nearby railroad station caught fire from an overheated stove. The fire soon spread to the ship, tied at the dock, and destroyed it. Efforts to cut Mount Washington loose were to no avail as it was a time of extremely low water and the hull was stuck fast in the mud of the lake bottom. Soon after, a local company was formed to build a new ship. Since Europe was already at war, and the US was stocking steel in a pre-war munitions build-up obtaining steel was impossible. It was cut into sections by Boston General Ship & Engine Works and transported to Lake Winnipesaukee on rail cars. A new twin-screw vessel was designed for the hull being welded back together at Lakeport. Powered by two steam engines taken from another ocean-going yacht, the new MS Mount Washington made her maiden voyage on August 15, 1940.

Two years after her launch, the new Mount Washingtons engines and boilers were removed for use in a navy vessel during World War II. After the war, Mount Washington returned to the water. The ship was a success in the post-war tourist boom.

In 1982, Mount Washington was cut open and extended with an additional  hull section to add larger lounge and food service facilities. Still popular, she makes one or two round trips on the lake per day during the summer season, as well as numerous dinner dance cruises in the evenings.

Mailboat M/V Sophie C.

The M/V Sophie C. is the oldest, and one of only two currently operating, floating United States Postal Service post offices. Floating post office service was started on Lake Winnipesaukee in 1892, and currently delivers mail daily to eight of the lake's islands between June and September. The Sophie C. was built by Boston General Ship & Engine Works in 1945 to temporarily replace the Mount Washington, whose engines and boilers had been commandeered by the Navy during World War II, and she took over the mail route from the Uncle Sam II in 1969.

As a floating post office, Sophie C. delivers mail Monday-Saturday, sells postage, and collects and postmarks outgoing mail. Sophie C. also operates as a sightseeing boat, carrying up to 125 people on her two cruises a day as she delivers mail, and sells ice cream and snacks to residents of the islands she serves. In 2018 and 2019, the M/V Doris E. replaced the Sophie C. as mail boat while the latter was undergoing repairs.

Others
The steamship Dover,  in length, captained by Winborn Sanborn, operated by the Cocheco Railroad, traveled the lake in the 1850s. It was refloated, but by the 1870s the new Mount Washington had replaced it.

Seaplane base 
The Alton Bay Seaplane Base is a state-owned, public-use seaplane base in Alton Bay, the southeast arm of the lake. In the winter it is the only FAA-approved ice runway in the contiguous United States, conditions permitting.

Weather and climate 
Average summertime on or next to the water brings days around 80 °F (26 °C), with overnight lows around 65 °F (18 °C). Less than one-half mile (800 m) away from the water, days can be warmer and nights cooler by several degrees. Summer's most extreme temperatures away from the water may be as high as 100 °F (38 °C) and as low as 50 °F (10 °C). A typical winter day brings a maximum of 28 °F (−2 °C) with overnight minimum around 15 °F (−9 °C). Typical wintertime extremes are 50 °F (10 °C) and −20 °F (−30 °C) but even greater extremes have been recorded nearby.

The water temperature typically reaches the upper 70s F (around 25 °C) in late July and cools into the 60s (around 18 °C) in September. Several days of hot, humid weather at the height of summer can bring the water temperature well above 80 °F (26 °C). It normally freezes during the last week of December.

Ice-In and Ice-Out 

Lake Winnipesaukee is known for its annual Ice-Out Contest, in which people try to guess the earliest date that the Mount Washington can safely leave her port in Center Harbor and motor to four other ports (Weirs Beach, Alton Bay, Wolfeboro, and Meredith). Since records began in 1851, ice-out has happened as early as March 18 and as late as May 12, although 90 percent of the time it is declared during April. This official ruling is made by David Emerson of Emerson Aviation.

In popular culture

 Thornton Wilder's 1938 Pulitzer Prize–winning play, Our Town, refers to Lake Winnipesaukee at the beginning of Act III.
 In a Three Stooges 1940 short "No Census, No Feeling", the Stooges are census takers, and Curly answers a query about his birthplace with "Lake Winnipesaukee". When Moe asks him to spell it, he switches course, and says "Make it Lake Erie – I've got an uncle there."
 Some boating scenes from the 1981 Academy Award-winning film On Golden Pond were shot on the lake, though the main scenes were on nearby Squam Lake.
 In 1982, composer Alan Hovhaness, who spent much of his childhood in New Hampshire, composed Lake Winnipesaukee, Op. 363, a sextet for flute, oboe, cello, two percussion, and piano.
 The 1991 comedy movie What About Bob? was set at Lake Winnipesaukee, although the actual filming was done at Smith Mountain Lake in Virginia.
 The 2006 comedy Click has a flashback depicting Adam Sandler as a kid playing on a beach on Lake Winnipesaukee.
 In the debut of Adam Sandler's "Thanksgiving Song", on Saturday Night Live (November 21, 1992), the long-time New Hampshire resident sings, "I used to go to camp at Lake Winnipesaukee".
 On The Tonight Show Starring Jimmy Fallon, host Jimmy Fallon and frequent guest Justin Timberlake have filmed a series of sketches set at a fictional "Camp Winnipesaukee".
 In Nemesis Games, the fifth book in The Expanse novel series, Rattlesnake Island is the site of a private spaceship launchpad for the wealthy.  It was then featured in the fifth season of the TV series of the same name in the ninth episode, titled "Winnipesaukee".   
 In Spymaster, part of Brad Thor's Scot Harvath series of books, the character Reed Carlton is cared for in a house on Governors Island on Lake Winnipesaukee.
 Irish acoustic folk rock band Hermitage Green wrote a song about the lake, entitled "Lake Winnipesaukee".

See also

 Lake Winnipesaukee mystery stone
 List of lakes in New Hampshire

References

 The New Hampshire State Almanac

External links

 LakeWinnipesaukee.info
 LakeWinnipesaukee.net
 Winnipesaukee.com
 Lake level graphs, NH Dept. of Environmental Services
 Lake Winnipesaukee Historical Society
 Lakes Region Conservation Trust
 Lake Winnipesaukee Gallery at Whitemountainart.com
"Lake Winnipesauke {{sic}} Steamer" watercolor (1893) by D.J. Kennedy; Historical Society of Pennsylvania

Webcams

 Alton Bay – WinnipesaukeeCam
 Bear Island Conservation Association – BearCam
 Black Cat Island – Lake Winnipesaukee WeatherCam
 Rattlesnake Island
 Weirs Beach – WeirsCAM
 Weirs Channel
 Wolfeboro Bay – WolfeboroCam

 
Lakes of Belknap County, New Hampshire
Lakes of Carroll County, New Hampshire
Lakes of New Hampshire
New Hampshire placenames of Native American origin